Duolu Qaghan was a ruler of the Western Turkic Khaganate during 632–634 or 633–634.

Early life 
He was Bagha Shad's son. After his uncle Tong Yabgu was killed by Külüg Sibir, the candidate of eastern or Duolu faction (the other being the western Nushibi faction) the Duolu tribes became the dominant power of the western empire. Nishu, then a partisan of rival Nushibi clan supported his cousin (Tong's son) Dieli Teqin to throne in 631. In 633 after a coup, Dieli escaped to south and Nushibi clan supported Nishu who was a living in Karasahr (now a city in Xinjiang Uighur Autonomous Region of China) to throne. 

According to the Turkish historian Prof. Dr. Aydın Usta, who relies on the medieval Persian historian Al-Taberi, Ibn al-Athir and Belazuri, Duolu tried to help Khusrow III against the armies of the Arabic caliphate and participated in minor battles, but he had to return east because of a rebellion.

Reign 
Beginning with his reign, the Nushibi clan became the dominant power. In 634 after a year of rule he died and left his throne to his brother Tong Shad (later Ishbara Tolis).

References

Turkic rulers
Year of birth unknown
Ashina house of the Turkic Empire
Year of death missing